"Useless" is a song by English electronic music group Depeche Mode, released on 20 October 1997 as the fourth and final single from their ninth studio album, Ultra (1997). It was released with "Home" as a double A-side in the United States due to "Useless" getting airplay on US radio stations before "Home" was announced. "Useless" features a bass contribution performed by bassist Doug Wimbish, known for his session work and as a member of Living Color.

Release
The single version of "Useless" was remixed by Alan Moulder, and is not only shortened but also features several alterations (similar to the changes done to the 7-inch versions of "Behind the Wheel" and "Condemnation"), such as having a different beat and is slightly sped up. Several elements have also been mixed to sound harsher, such as the synth on the second chorus. On the US double A-side single, the single remix is replaced by the CJ Bolland Ultrasonar Edit.

There are no actual B-sides for "Useless", except for remixes and live versions of the song. Some versions of the CD single feature the videos for "Barrel of a Gun" and "It's No Good". The 1997 music video for "Useless" was the last Depeche Mode video to be directed by Anton Corbijn for more than eight years. Though he remained working for Depeche Mode on all their album/single covers, press images and tour projections/designs, the record label decided to experiment with new directors for music videos. Corbijn's next video project with Depeche Mode was for "Suffer Well".

Depeche Mode licensed the Kruder & Dorfmeister remix of "Useless" to Victoria's Secret, for use in their "Natural Miracle Bra" ad campaign. It aired on US television for a few weeks.

Track listings
All songs were written by Martin L. Gore. The live version of "Useless" was recorded on 10 April 1997 in London, England.

12-inch: Mute / 12Bong28 (UK)
 "Useless" (The Kruder + Dorfmeister Session™) (9:10)
 "Useless" (CJ Bolland Funky sub mix) (5:38)
 "Useless" (Air 20 mix)" (7:56) (remixed by Carl Craig)

CD: Mute / CDBong28 (UK)
 "Useless" (remix) (4:53) (remixed by Alan Moulder)
 "Useless" (Escape from Wherever: parts 1 & 2!) (7:17) (remixed by Barry Adamson)
 "Useless" (Cosmic Blues mix) (6:57)
 Includes a bonus "Barrel of a Gun" video.

CD: Mute / LCDBong28 (UK)
 "Useless" (CJ Bolland Ultrasonar mix) (6:03)
 "Useless" (The Kruder + Dorfmeister Session™) (9:10)
 "Useless" (live) (5:21)
 Includes a bonus "It's No Good" video.

CD: Mute / CDBong28X (Europe, 2004)
 "Useless" (remix) (4:55)
 "Useless" (Escape from Wherever: Parts 1 & 2!)(7:17)
 "Useless" (Cosmic Blues mix) (6:57)
 "Useless" (CJ Bolland Ultrasonar mix) (6:03)
 "Useless" (The Kruder + Dorfmeister Session™) (9:10)
 "Useless" (CJ Bolland Funky sub mix) (5:38)
 "Useless" (Air 20 mix) (7:56)
 "Useless" (Live) (5:21)
 Includes both "Barrel of a Gun" and "It's No Good" videos.

"Home" / "Useless"

In November 1997, "Home" and "Useless" were released as a double A-side single in the US and Canada. The front cover art has the "Home" cover on the front, with the "Home" track list, and the back cover art has the "Useless" cover art, with the "Useless" track list.

Track listings
All songs were written by Gore. Gore sings lead on "Home", and David Gahan sings lead on "Useless".

7-inch: reprise / 7-17314 (US)
 "Home" (5:46)
 "Useless" (CJ Bolland Ultrasonar edit) (4:06)

CD: reprise / 9 17314-2 (US)
 "Home" (5:46)
 "Home" (Air "Around the Golf" remix) (3:58)
 "Useless" (CJ Bolland Ultrasonar Edit) (4:06)

CD: reprise / 9 43906-2 (US)
 "Home" (5:46)
 "Home" (Grantby mix) (4:38)
 "Home" (LFO Meant to Be) (4:26)
 "Home" (The Noodles and The Damage Done) (6:22)
 Remix by Skylab
 "Useless" (CJ Bolland Ultrasonar mix) (6:00)
 "Useless" (CJ Bolland Funky sub mix) (5:38)
 "Useless" (Kruder + Dorfmeister Session™) (9:10)
 "Useless" (Escape from Wherever: parts 1 & 2) (7:15)
 Also includes the videos for "Barrel of a Gun", "It's No Good", "Home", and "Useless". Packaged in a clear plastic case with sliding pull-out disc tray.

Charts

Release history

References

External links
 Single information from the official Depeche Mode web site
 Allmusic review

1997 singles
1997 songs
Depeche Mode songs
Music videos directed by Anton Corbijn
Mute Records singles
Reprise Records singles
Song recordings produced by Bomb the Bass
Songs written by Martin Gore